Bader Abdurahman (Arabic:بدر عبد الرحمن) (born 29 August 1983) is an Emirati former professional footballer who played as a right-back for numerous football clubs before retiring at Hatta Club in 2017.

External links

References

Emirati footballers
1983 births
Living people
Al Ahli Club (Dubai) players
Al Shabab Al Arabi Club Dubai players
Al-Wasl F.C. players
Sharjah FC players
Hatta Club players
UAE First Division League players
UAE Pro League players
Association football fullbacks